Al-Falah University (AFU) is a private university located in Faridabad, Haryana, India. The university was established in 2014 by the Al-Falah Charitable Trust through The Haryana Private Universities (Amendment) Act, 2014. Like all universities in India, AFU is recognised by the University Grants Commission (UGC).

Schools
The university runs the following schools:
AL-Falah School Of Medical Science
Al-Falah School Of Education & Training
Al-Falah School Of Humanities & Languages
Al-Falah School Of Physical & Molecular Science
Al-Falah School Of Social Science

References

External links

Education in Faridabad
Universities in Haryana
Educational institutions established in 2014
2014 establishments in Haryana
Private universities in India